Lyonville is an unincorporated community in Brule County, in the U.S. state of South Dakota.

History
Lyonville was laid out in 1886. A post office called Lyonville was established in 1882, and remained in operation until 1945. Charles Lyons, an early postmaster, most likely gave the community his name.

References

Unincorporated communities in Brule County, South Dakota
Unincorporated communities in South Dakota